Nazario Herrera Ortega (born 28 July 1964) is a Mexican politician from the Institutional Revolutionary Party (formerly from the National Action Party. From 2010 to 2012 he served as Deputy of the LXI Legislature of the Mexican Congress representing Tlaxcala.

References

1964 births
Living people
People from Tlaxcala
National Action Party (Mexico) politicians
Institutional Revolutionary Party politicians
21st-century Mexican politicians
Deputies of the LXI Legislature of Mexico
Members of the Chamber of Deputies (Mexico) for Tlaxcala